Bob Colacello (born 1947) is an American writer. Born in Bensonhurst, New York, and raised in Plainview, Long Island, he graduated from the Edmund A. Walsh School of Foreign Service at Georgetown University in 1969, and also has an MFA degree in film criticism from Columbia University Graduate School of the Arts.

Early endeavors and Interview magazine 
Colacello began his writing career around 1969, when he began publishing film reviews in the Village Voice weekly. As a graduate student in the Film department at Columbia University in New York, his first publications doubled as his class essays and homework assignments. In 1970, Colacello wrote a review of Andy Warhol's film Trash, which he hailed as a "great Roman Catholic masterpiece". This review garnered the attention of Warhol, and Paul Morrissey, the director of many of Warhol's films, who approached Colacello to write for Interview magazine, a new art/film/fashion magazine Warhol had recently begun to publish. Colacello was made editor of Interview within six months and, for the next 12 years, remained directly involved in all aspects of life and business at The Factory— Warhol's studio—as he developed the magazine into one of the best-known lifestyle magazines of the time. As Colacello himself writes in Holy Terror: Andy Warhol Close up (1990), Warhol suggested Colacello change his name to Bob Cola, in order to sound more "pop."

Biographical writings 
After his tenure with Interview, Colacello began writing for Vanity Fair magazine, and has been a regular contributor since, writing extended profiles on a wide range of public personalities, including Prince Charles and Camilla Parker Bowles, Balthus, Rudolf Nureyev, Liza Minnelli, Estée Lauder, Doris Duke, and Naomi Campbell. Colacello is also a biographer. He is the author of Ronnie and Nancy: Their Path to the White House, 1911-1980, about the social and political rise of Ronald Reagan and his wife Nancy Reagan. His memoir of working with Andy Warhol in the 1970s and early 1980s, titled Holy Terror: Andy Warhol Close Up,  was called the "best-written and the most killingly observed" book on the subject by The New York Times. Colacello has been coy about his sexuality in the past and once considered himself "presumably gay".

Books
Colacello, Bob. Ronnie & Nancy: Their Path to the White House, 1911 to 1980. Warner Books, 2004
Colacello, Bob. Bob Colacello's Out. Göttingen: Steidl, 2008
Colacello, Bob. Holy Terror: Andy Warhol Close Up. New York, New York: Harper Collins. Vintage reprint edition, March 11, 2014

Awards 

 2017 Paez Medal of Art, New York City (VAEA).

Notes 

1947 births
Living people
People from Bensonhurst, Brooklyn
American biographers
American male biographers
American magazine writers
Walsh School of Foreign Service alumni
Columbia University School of the Arts alumni
Historians from New York (state)
People from Plainview, New York
American LGBT writers
People associated with The Factory
American people of Italian descent